Rabee Al Msellati (born 22 February 1983 in Libya) is a Libyan football defender. He currently plays for Rafik in the Libyan Premier League.

Msellati made a substitute appearance for the Libya national football team in a friendly against Ukraine on 5 June 2006.

References

External links

1983 births
Living people
Libyan footballers
Libya international footballers
Association football midfielders